Miss Israel is a national beauty pageant in Israel. The pageant was founded in 1950, where the winners were sent to Miss Universe. The pageant was also existing to send delegates to Miss World, Miss International, Miss Europe and Miss Asia Pacific International. The 1994 competition was held in Yad Eliyahu Arena, Tel Aviv, and had 10 contestants. Ravit Yarkoni was the winner.

Placements

External links

1994 beauty pageants
1994 in Israel
Miss Israel